The American Fertility Association is a national non-profit organization based in New York City, which advocates and serves as a resource for topics related to fertility preservation, reproductive health and family building.  Founded in 1999, The AFA has been instrumental in advising health care professionals and related industry and legislative bodies on fertility issues.  A push by The AFA led to the passage of a New York state mandate in 2002 requiring insurance companies to cover the cost of certain diagnostics and treatments.

References

External links
 The American Fertility Association

Organizations based in New York City
Fertility
Organizations established in 1999
1999 establishments in New York City